Shatolow is a town in the southwestern Gedo region of Somalia.

References

Populated places in Gedo